Intérpretes is an EP released in 1990 by heavy metal band Hermética. It is an album of covers, including songs from artists like Motörhead, V8 and Manal, among others.

Production
Intérpretes is the second work produced by Hermética, after the 1989 Hermética album. At that point, the label Trípoli Discos could provide only 27 hours of recording time. The band accepted the proposal. Lacking new songs, the band recorded a cover album. 
Bassist Ricardo Iorio commented that they were not really interested in receiving royalties, and thus had no problems in recording covers.

One of the songs is a thrash metal version of the tango Cambalache. Iorio commented that the lyrics of the song, written in the 1930s, were still vigent, and close to the lyrics of Hermética. He also played the song as an homage to Enrique Santos Discépolo, a tango artist that influenced him, and pointed that the song is well-known in neighbour countries.

The band recorded as well "Destrucción" and "Ideando la fuga", two songs of V8, Iorio's previous band. Iorio commented that he does not like the songs as they were recorded by V8, because the albums (Luchando por el Metal and Un Paso Mas En La Batalla, respectively) had a weak production. He recorded them in Intérpretes because he considered that Hermética could play them better. Both songs were already included in the band's regular set of songs.

The album had similarities with the contemporary Metallica's cover album The $5.98 E.P. - Garage Days Re-Revisited. Iorio pointed that he was a fan of Budgie when he was aged 11, and saw with great pride that a prominent heavy metal band played one of their songs. The band included as well a cover of Motörhead's song No Class. It was the only song in English recorded by Hermética.

Track listing

Personnel

Band

Claudio O'Connor – vocals
Ricardo Iorio – bass, vocals on "Cambalache"
Antonio Romano – guitars
Tony Scotto – drums

,Others

 Nestor "Pajaro" Randazzo – sound engineer
 Cristian Jeroncic & Ricki – assistants
 Sergio Assabi – photography
 Gustavo Deferrari – executive producer
 Walter Kolm & Sergio Fasanelli – general producers
 Marcelo Tommy Moya – management
 Martin Gimeno – press/promotion

References

Hermética albums
Covers EPs
1990 EPs
Thrash metal EPs